Continuous Variable Valve Timing Control System (CVVTCS) is an automobile variable valve timing technology developed by Nissan. It is also used in a twin CVTC configuration on engines like the Nissan Juke's MR16DDT engine. CVVTCS is the successor to Nissan's earlier valve timing implementation NVCS.

Engines with CVVTCS 

 HR15DE
 HR16DE
 HR12DE
 MR18DE
 MRA8DE (twin intake/exhaust)
 MR20DE
 MR16DDT (twin intake/exhaust)
 QR25DE
 VQ23DE
 VQ25DET
 VQ25DD (NEO-Di)(eVTC)
 VQ30DD (NEO-Di)(eVTC)
 VQ25HR (twin intake/exhaust) (eVTC)
 VQ35DE (single intake/twin exhaust on some variants)
 VQ35HR (twin intake/exhaust) (eVTC)
 VQ37VHR (twin intake/exhaust) (eVTC) (also uses Variable Valve Event and Lift)
 VQ40DE
 VR38DETT
 VK45DE
 VK50VE (twin intake/exhaust) (also uses Variable Valve Event and Lift)
 VK56DE (2007+)
 VK56VD (twin intake/exhaust) (also uses Variable Valve Event and Lift)

See also 
 Nissan Variable Cam Timing
 Nissan Variable Valve Event and Lift
 Nissan Variable Valve Lift and Timing

Variable valve timing
Nissan